William Ramsden may refer to:

 William Ramsden (British Army officer) (1888–1969), British Army commander during World War II
 William Ramsden (died 1623), Lord of the Manor of Huddersfield in Yorkshire, England 
 Sir William Ramsden, 2nd Baronet (1672–1736)
 Sir John William Ramsden, 5th Baronet (1831–1914), British Liberal Party politician
 Sir William Pennington-Ramsden, 7th Baronet (1904–1986)